
Gmina Rabka-Zdrój is an urban-rural gmina (administrative district) in Nowy Targ County, Lesser Poland Voivodeship, in southern Poland.

Villages
Apart from the town of Rabka-Zdrój, the gmina contains the villages of Chabówka, Ponice and Rdzawka.

Neighbouring gminas
Gmina Rabka-Zdrój is bordered by the gminas of Lubień, Mszana Dolna, Niedźwiedź, Nowy Targ and Raba Wyżna.

References
Polish official population figures 2006

Rabka-Zdroj
Gmina Rabka Zdroj